In the Hollywood movie industry, a four-quadrant movie is one which appeals to all four major demographic "quadrants" of the moviegoing audience: both male and female, and both over- and under-25s.

Criteria
Films are generally aimed at at least two such quadrants, and most tent-pole films are four-quadrant movies. A film's budget is often correlated to the number of quadrants the film is expected to reach, and movies are rarely produced if not focused on at least two quadrants.

Examples
Although four-quadrant movies are generally family-friendly, this is not a requirement. Titanic, which was the highest grossing film ever following its theatrical run, has been cited as a strong example of a four-quadrant movie that blended action and romance in a historical setting to appeal to all four quadrants. Some other films exhibiting this quality may be comedic (such as Meet the Parents) or horror films, or be crowd-pleasing in nature, such as high-profile action films or adaptations of popular novels. Four-quadrant movies often have both adult and child protagonists. They are often built on a "high-concept" premise with well-delineated heroes and villains, with emotion, action and danger present in the story.

See also 
 Blockbuster (entertainment)
 Event movie
 Family movie
 List of highest-grossing films
 Tent-pole film

References 

Film and video terminology
Film industry